Vanessa Winship HonFRPS (born 1960) is a British photographer who works on long term projects of portrait, landscape, reportage and documentary photography. These personal projects have predominantly been in Eastern Europe but also the USA. Winship's books include Schwarzes Meer (2007), Sweet Nothings (2008) and She Dances on Jackson (2013).

Her first retrospective exhibition was at Fundación Mapfre gallery in Madrid in 2014. Her first major UK solo exhibition is at Barbican Art Gallery, London, in 2018. Her work has also been exhibited twice in the National Portrait Gallery in London and prominently at Rencontres d'Arles in France.

Winship has won two World Press Photo Awards, 'Photographer of the Year' at the Sony World Photography Awards, the HCB Award (the first woman to do so) and in 2018 an Honorary Fellowship of the Royal Photographic Society. She is a member of Agence Vu photography agency.

Biography
Winship grew up in Barton-upon-Humber, rural Lincolnshire. She studied at Baysgarth School; Hull Art College (which included a photography module); photography at Filton Technical College, Bristol; and photography, film, and video at the Polytechnic of Central London from 1984 to 1987, graduating with a BA (Hons). She met her husband, the photographer George Georgiou, on the degree course.

From 1999 she spent a decade living and working in the Balkans and surrounding territories of Turkey and the Black Sea. First she lived in Belgrade, for a short while in Athens, and five years in Istanbul.

Her work is about the concepts of borders, land, desire, identity, belonging, memory and history, how those histories are told and how identities are expressed.

Her books have been widely acclaimed. Sean O'Hagan, writing in The Guardian, said "She is perhaps best known for Sweet Nothings, one of my favourite photography books of recent years". She Dances on Jackson was considered by Simon Bainbridge (editor of the BJP), Sean O'Hagan, Rob Hornstra and other reviewers to be shortlisted amongst the best photography books released in 2013. Phil Coomes, Picture editor at BBC News said "This is pure photography, and in my view, when viewed as a whole, is about as good as it gets."

Winship is a member of Agence Vu photography agency and the World Photographic Academy. As of 2012 and 2013 she was based in London and Folkestone, England.

Techniques
Winship and George Georgiou travel together, alternating between one working and the other either supporting them or experimenting with their own photography.

She uses black-and-white photographic film in natural light. For her work in a reportage—or street—style she has used a 35 mm hand-held camera, for her landscape work she has at times used a medium format camera and for her portraiture work she has at times used a 5×4-inch large format camera. She says of the difference between using 35 mm and large format that "Each methodology makes for a different relationship with my subjects [and] both have their own beauty for me".

Projects
 Georgia in Transition (2004)
 Ukraine, Spring (2005)
 Imagined States and Desires: A Balkan Journey 1 (2006)
 Ashura – Turkey, Istanbul (2006)
 Black Sea: Between chronicle and fiction (2007)
 Sweet Nothings: The Schoolgirls from the Borderlands of Eastern Anatolia (2007)
 Georgia, a Small Piece of Eden (2009)
 Georgia, Schoolchildren (2011)

Publications

Publications by Winship
Schwarzes Meer (Black Sea). Hamburg: Mare, 2007. .
Sweet Nothings.
Marseille, France: Images en Manœuvres, 2008. .
London: Foto8, 2008. .
She Dances on Jackson. London: Mack, 2013. . Reprint edition. London: Mack, 2018.
Vanessa Winship. Madrid: Fundación Mapfre, 2014. . A retrospective.
And Time Folds. London: Mack, 2018. . A retrospective. Published to accompany an exhibition at Barbican Art Gallery, London. Photographs from seven series, made in the Balkans, Turkey, the Caucasus, Georgia, America and the UK, as well as Winship's personal archival material and an essay by David Chandler.
Seeing The Light of Day. B-Sides Box Set, 2019. Set of 50 cards. Edition of 1000 copies.
Sete 19. le bec en l'air, 2019. With a text by :fr:Christian Caujolle.
Snow. Los Angeles: Deadbeat Club, 2022. With a story by Jem Poster. . Soft cover.

Publications with contributions by Winship
The Grain of the Present. San Francisco: Pier 24 Photography, 2017. . With a text by Kim Beil. Edition of 1000 copies. Exhibition catalogue.

Exhibitions

Solo exhibitions
 Black Sea, Vannes, 2008; Paris, 2008; Shenyang, 2008; Newcastle, UK, 2009; Sète, 2011; Rome, 2011.
 Sweet Nothings: The Schoolgirls from the Borderlands of Eastern Anatolia, Rencontres d'Arles, France, 2008; Athens, 2008; Lillebonne, 2009; London, 2009; Rotterdam, Netherlands, 2009; Newcastle, UK, 2009; Saint-Denis, 2010; Foligno, 2010; Milan, 2010; Vichy, 2013.
 Georgia, Rencontres internationales de la photographie en Gaspésie, Canada, 2012; Third Floor Gallery, Cardiff, Wales, 2013.
 She Dances on Jackson, Henri Cartier-Bresson Foundation, Paris, 2013.
 Retrospective, Fundación Mapfre gallery, Madrid, during PHotoEspaña, 2014.
Vanessa Winship: And Time Folds, Barbican Art Gallery, London, 2018 Work from Imagined States and Desires: a Balkan Journey, Black Sea: Between Chronicle and Fiction, Sweet Nothings, Georgia: Seeds Carried by the wind, Humber, And Time Folds, She Dances on Jackson as well as ephemera.

Exhibitions with others
Voyage Mélancolique, Le château d’eau, pôle photographique de Toulouse, Toulouse, France, 2015. Work from Black Sea, Georgia, She dances on Jackson and Sweet Nothings. Exhibited alongside Last Stop by George Georgiou.
Ballarat International Foto Biennale, Ballarat, Victoria, Australia, 2019

Awards
 1998 – First prize, Arts Stories category, World Press Photo Awards, for Junior Ballroom Dancers
 2003 – Honorable mention, Leica Oskar Barnack Award, awarded by Leica Camera AG at Rencontres Internationales de la Photographie, Arles, France, for "Albanian Landscape"
 2008
 Godfrey Argent Award for the best portrait in black and white (part of the Taylor Wessing Photographic Portrait Prize), National Portrait Gallery, London, for the series Sweet Nothings
 Iris D'Or (overall winner), Photographer of the Year, Sony World Photography Awards, World Photography Organisation (WPO)
 Winner, Portraiture category, Professional Competition, Sony World Photography Awards, World Photography Organisation (WPO), for a photograph from Sweet Nothings
 First prize, Portraits Stories category, 2007 World Press Photo Awards, for Sweet Nothings
 FIOF (Fondo Internazionale Orvieto Fotografia) Book Prize 2008 (AKA the Orvieto Book Prize), Reportage section, awarded by Associazione Fotografi Italiana, Orvieto, Italy, for Schwarzes Meer
 Final selection, Leica Oskar Barnack Award, awarded by Leica Camera AG at Rencontres Internationales de la Photographie, Arles, France, for Schwarzes Meer
 2009 – Second Prize, Taylor Wessing Photographic Portrait Prize, National Portrait Gallery, London, for Girl in a Golden Dress from the series Georgia for a Song
 2010
 PHotoEspaña (PHE) Discovery Award for best portfolio (Premio PHotoEspaña Descubrimientos al mejor portfolio), International Festival of Photography and Visual Arts, Madrid, Spain, for the series Sweet Nothings
National Media Museum 2010 Photography Award, Bradford, England
 2011 – Prize-winner,  2011, Henri Cartier-Bresson Foundation, a €30,000 grant for She Dances on Jackson (then known as Out there: An American Odyssey)
2018: Honorary Fellowship of the Royal Photographic Society, Bath

Notes

References

External links
 
 Agence Vu, who represent Winship – includes a portfolio of photographs
 "Planet of the dispossessed – in pictures" – A gallery of photographs in The Guardian
 A Conversation with Vanessa Winship – interview with Jörg Colberg, 2009
 Interview with Winship by Zaman Daily Newspaper (video)

Living people
1960 births
Date of birth missing (living people)
Place of birth missing (living people)
21st-century British photographers
21st-century women photographers
British portrait photographers
Documentary photographers
English women photographers
Landscape photographers
People from Barton-upon-Humber
Photographers from Lincolnshire
21st-century English women
21st-century English people
Women photojournalists